UNIT is a fictional military organisation from the British science fiction television series Doctor Who and its spin-off series Torchwood and The Sarah Jane Adventures. Operating under the auspices of the United Nations and initially led by Brigadier Lethbridge-Stewart, its purpose is to investigate and combat paranormal and extraterrestrial threats to Earth. Several UNIT personnel (such as the Brigadier, Sergeant Benton and Mike Yates) played a major role in the original Doctor Who series, and it was a regular feature from The Invasion (1968) until The Seeds of Doom (1976).

Originally referred to as the United Nations Intelligence Taskforce, executive producer Russell T Davies said in 2005 that the UN was no longer happy to be associated with the fictional organisation and the UN's full name could now no longer be used. However, the "UNIT" and "UN" abbreviations could be used as long as it was not explained what the letters stood for. In 2008, he announced that the organisation's name had been changed to the Unified Intelligence Taskforce. This new name was first mentioned on-screen in "The Sontaran Stratagem", also in 2008, in which it was indicated in a line of dialogue that the United Nations still supports UNIT with funding.

Creation 

In a 2014 interview with Doctor Who Magazine, script editor Terrance Dicks recalled that he was present at the "birth" of UNIT during the production of the Doctor Who serial The Invasion (1968). He credited both scriptwriter and script editor Derrick Sherwin and producer Peter Bryant as having come up with the idea beforehand, claiming that they were testing the concept in The Invasion before it had become central to the show in the Doctor Who serial Spearhead from Space (1970). In a series of interviews originally recorded for the 2006 DVD of the Doctor Who serial Inferno (1970), actor Nicholas Courtney, who played Brigadier Lethbridge-Stewart in The Invasion, similarly described The Invasion as a "dummy run" for the idea of the Doctor, the main protagonist of Doctor Who, being exiled to Earth. Dicks also said that the idea of exiling the Doctor was done because making every serial take place on Earth was cheaper to produce than if every serial had to have a new alien planet built, and that UNIT was an idea Sherwin had come up with to answer the question of what to do with the Doctor after he was exiled to Earth. Speaking in an interview on the 2012 DVD of the Doctor Who serial The Krotons (1968–69), Sherwin said that he wanted Doctor Who to be "down on Earth anyway, for credibility", and described UNIT as "the ideal vehicle" for this.

In another 2014 interview in Doctor Who Magazine, Sherwin recalled that after submitting his scripts for The Invasion to Bryant, which included UNIT, Sherwin, who was also working freelance as a script editor, was told by Bryant to introduce his UNIT idea earlier, as it could "take some of the weight off [the] shoulders" of actor Patrick Troughton, who played the Doctor. Speaking in an interview on the 2011 special-edition DVD of Spearhead from Space, Sherwin claimed that he had created UNIT because he wanted to give some "considerable support" to the Doctor, "so that [Troughton] didn't have so many damn lines to learn each week".

Sherwin told Doctor Who Magazine in 2014 that while working as script editor on the Doctor Who serial The Web of Fear (1968), which also involved an army, he told scriptwriters Mervyn Haisman and Henry Lincoln to include all of the characters that he had originally invented for The Invasion. Sherwin was uncertain if the army forces featured in The Web of Fear appeared as UNIT, but was "convinced" that, as a teaser for UNIT's more substantial role in The Invasion, The Web of Fear was supposed to have replaced the basic army forces that were seen in the story. Sherwin asserted that he held the copyright on Lethbridge-Stewart, as he "created him in The Invasion". However, previously in an interview recorded for the 2006 DVD of Inferno, Sherwin described The Invasion as the start of UNIT and the beginning of the Doctor "coming down to Earth". On top of this, production notes in Doctor Who: The Complete History credit Haisman and Lincoln as the owners of Lethbridge-Stewart, who was the army leader from The Web of Fear, and mention how Bryant and director Douglas Camfield were negotiating the use of the character for The Invasion from Haisman and Lincoln in May 1968, subsequent to The Web of Fear being broadcast in February and March. The Web of Fear is also described in the notes as being a "major influence on The Invasion".

Fictional history

The roots of UNIT in the Doctor Who universe lie in the Second Doctor serial The Web of Fear (1968), following which the organisation is named and established in The Invasion (1968). According to "Survivors of the Flux" (2021), UNIT was founded in 1958 and built over the subsequent decade, with Lethbridge-Stewart joining the taskforce after it failed to act on the events of The War Machines (1966).

Following The Invasion, the contribution of scientific advice in battling extraterrestrial threats is recognised and both Dr Elizabeth Shaw and the exiled Third Doctor joins UNIT just in time to help defeat the Autons in Spearhead from Space (1970).

UNIT continued to feature in Doctor Who after Spearhead, but when the Third Doctor's exile is lifted in The Three Doctors (1972–73), his association with UNIT becomes more sporadic, especially after his regeneration into his fourth incarnation at the end of Planet of the Spiders (1974). The last appearance of UNIT in the series for many years was in The Seeds of Doom (1976); however, the organisation continues to execute its mandate to investigate and combat alien activity. The final appearance of UNIT during the original run of Doctor Who was the Seventh Doctor serial Battlefield (1989).

UNIT is mentioned by both its acronym and full name in the 2005 series episodes "Aliens of London" and "World War Three", where it sent a delegation to a gathering of experts at 10 Downing Street. UNIT appeared again the same year in "The Christmas Invasion". In addition to Doctor Who, UNIT has also featured in the spin-off series Torchwood and The Sarah Jane Adventures.

From "The Power of Three" (2012), the first on screen appearance of UNIT in any Whoniverse media since the two-part Doctor Who special "The End of Time" in 2009–2010, UNIT has been shown to have been reorganised by Kate Stewart, the Brigadier's daughter.

In the 2019 New Year special "Resolution", the Thirteenth Doctor attempts to call on Kate Stewart for assistance, but discovers UNIT operations have been suspended and replaced with an outsourced call centre, due to a diplomatic argument over funding.

In the 2020 New Year's Day episode, "Spyfall, Part 1", it is stated that UNIT and Torchwood no longer exist. The 2021 episode "Survivors of the Flux" reveals it to be caused by Grand Serpent, a political figure who assumed the identity of Prentis and was instrumental in UNIT’s formation, to facilitate the Sontarans’ invasion of Earth during the Flux crisis. UNIT is resurrected in the 2022 BBC Centenary special "The Power of the Doctor", once again under the leadership of Kate Stewart.

Organisation

UNIT's status is supported by enabling legislation that allows it to assume emergency powers when necessary. Although it operates under the authority of the United Nations, its members are seconded from the host country's military and are still bound to obey that chain of command. Ranks, within the UK section of UNIT at least, thus mirror those in the British Army — Lethbridge-Stewart is a Brigadier, Yates is a Captain, a Major appears in "The Christmas Invasion" (2005), and a Colonel and Captain appear in "The Sontaran Stratagem"/"The Poison Sky" (2008). UNIT personnel are seconded from the Royal Navy, British Army and Royal Air Force, and are still bound by the UK chain of command, and the commander reports to the Prime Minister and the Ministry of Defence through Department C-19. However, if the commander feels it appropriate and necessary, the commander can request that Geneva overrule the national government. Lethbridge-Stewart, for example, reports to the Ministry of Defence and the Prime Minister, and Major Blake reports to the Prime Minister in "The Christmas Invasion". UNIT is able to call on the conventional military branches for support, such as the RAF for precision air-strikes. Due to the international nature of the organisation, it is sometimes viewed with suspicion by local military and national security agencies, who feel that it might impinge on their sovereignty. UNIT's existence is known to the public, but mainly as a security organisation with scientific expertise; its actual agenda is classified, some believing it to be some kind of covert counter-terrorist unit. Although the Brigadier originally states that UNIT do not arrest people, as of the 21st century, UNIT has the authority to detain persons indefinitely without trial, appeal, outside contact or legal representation, as experienced by Toshiko Sato before she was recruited to work for the British government by the Torchwood Institute in a flashback in the Torchwood episode "Fragments" (2008). The organisation was rearranged by Kate Stewart, the daughter of Brigadier Lethbridge-Stewart. In "The Power of Three" (2012), Kate heads UNIT's scientific research department, which now has authority over the military branch.

Equipment
In the 1970s-produced serials, the British troops of UNIT are armed with standard British Army weapons such as the L1A1 Self-Loading Rifle, Sterling submachine gun, Browning Hi-Power pistol and wear 58 pattern webbing. They are also shown utilising heavy weaponry such as bazookas, machine guns, mortars and, in Terror of the Zygons (1975), a depth charge launcher. For Battlefield (1989), they have the Steyr AUG assault rifle while the Brigadier uses a Webley Revolver. In the 2000s, they use Heckler & Koch G36C carbine, the M4 carbine (with different scopes used such as ACOG and holographic weapon sights, as well as equipping CQB receivers for indoor use), SIG P226 pistols, and for heavy duty, use Stinger missile launchers. They wear PLCE pouches on police tac-vests, and also wear riot-protection arm pads and gloves, and have side-handle batons and quick-cuffs for arrests. In "The Power of Three", they are further equipped with PASGT helmets, goggles, and riot armour for their shins.

UNIT's personnel have a wide range of weaponry to call on, some custom-made to combat specific threats. Among these are special ammunition described by the Brigadier in Battlefield as armour-piercing rounds with a solid core and Teflon coating which "could go through a Dalek". Other munitions include explosive rounds for Yetis, other armour-piercing rounds for robots, and gold-tipped rounds for use against the Cybermen (as well as silver bullets as suggested by the Doctor), and rad-steel coated bullets to neutralise Sontaran anti-bullet fields that target copper.

In The Invasion (1968), UNIT has a command centre established in the cargo hold of a Lockheed Hercules military transport aircraft. The Dæmons (1971) features the UNIT Mobile HQ, a large bus-like vehicle that could be driven to the site of an incident. A mobile command centre is also shown in "The Sontaran Stratagem" and "The Poison Sky", where it is depicted as a black articulated lorry with UNIT insignia.

UNIT employs unarmed helicopters for transport and light air support. It is also shown using a tank in Robot (1974–75). In "Planet of the Dead" (2009), it uses trucks with SAM launchers.

In "The Christmas Invasion", UNIT is shown to have translation software which can decipher alien languages with great accuracy. The software, or at least the results from the translation, can be loaded on a hand-held device.

In "The Poison Sky", UNIT is shown to be able to command and co-ordinate the world's combined nuclear arsenal for strategic strikes on orbiting alien craft.

In "The Sound of Drums" (2007), the flying aircraft carrier the Valiant is introduced. The Valiant is also shown (in "The Poison Sky") to be equipped with a scaled down version of the Torchwood Institute weapon that destroyed the Sycorax ship in "The Christmas Invasion".

It is mentioned in The Sarah Jane Adventures story Death of the Doctor (2010) that UNIT has a Moonbase.

In "The Power of Three", UNIT is shown to have a scientific research department with a large laboratory in the base beneath the Tower of London. During the story, the laboratory is dedicated to studying cubes that appeared out of nowhere. Kate Stewart, daughter of the Brigadier and head of the scientific research department, has a handheld device that can scan a body (picking up the Eleventh Doctor's twin hearts), and also serves as a communication device. The computers at UNIT HQ can detect anomalies such as artron energy spikes, and can also access CCTV on the streets. There is also mention of them using helicopters and tanks while testing the destructibility of the cubes.

"The Day of the Doctor" (2013) shows that the Tower of London base contains the Black Archive housing various alien technological devices that UNIT has salvaged over the years and kept hidden away. Protected by various alien defences that erase the memories of visitors to ensure that they cannot reveal what is inside the Archive, the Archive is also 'TARDIS-proof', and has been used by UNIT as a means of assessing the Doctor's companions to confirm whether they can be trusted. UNIT is also shown to at least have access to the Under-Gallery, a secret gallery containing works of art dating back to the Elizabethan era that Elizabeth I ordered locked away as they were too dangerous for the public.

Uniform

Across the eras, UNIT have been identified with different styles of uniform.

For The Invasion, Privates and Corporals wore No.7 dress, while ranks of Sergeant and above wore uniforms based on No.4 dress, but lacking buttons and with the jacket – which appears to be fastened by velcro – tucked into the trousers. All UNIT members wore oval patches with 'U.N.I.T' embroidered on them on their left sleeves and NCOs wore their badges of rank on their right sleeves. Sand/Beige coloured berets, similar to those worn by the Special Air Service with the black UNIT logo on a round white background as a cap badge were worn by all ranks. There was also the assault team, who wore 1960 pattern fatigues and dark berets with the same UNIT insignia. For UNIT's next appearance, Spearhead from Space (1970), the No.4s became uniform for all ranks, except for two radar operators seen in the opening who wear No.7s; the female officer wearing a tie with a UNIT logo printed on. The No.4 style of uniform stayed throughout Doctor Who and the Silurians (1970).

Christine Rawlins had a new futuristic-looking design produced for The Ambassadors of Death (1970), which features only in this story. All ranks are given khaki-coloured zip-up jackets without lapels, which are worn over tan rolled-neck sweaters. The Brigadier retained his No.4 uniform.

For Inferno (1970), these changed to Denison smock camouflage uniforms. From Terror of the Autons, producer Barry Letts decided to have UNIT wearing 1960 pattern fatigues, while the Brigadier, Sergeant Benton and Captain Yates also wear appropriate contemporary uniform, such as service dress and barrack dress. The UNIT patches and tan berets remain standard, except for the Brigadier and Yates, who also wore caps with their rank insignia.

The fatigues were changed for Terror of the Zygons, as director Douglas Camfield reckoned the fatigues "looked too soft". For this serial, they wear DPM camouflage jackets and tactical black cap badges. The Android Invasion (1975) sees them wearing barrack dress, which they also wear for their brief appearance in The Seeds of Doom (1976).

UNIT then had a lengthy absence from the screen. They made a small cameo appearance in The Five Doctors (1983), which sees Colonel Crichton wearing service dress and a Sergeant in barrack dress, both with the oval patches on their uniform. Captain Yates returns in the serial also wearing service dress but with no markings.

For their full return in Battlefield, their look was completely updated. Their appearance in this serial is close to the real-world United Nations Peacekeeping troop outfits. UNIT are represented by a nuclear missile convoy wearing UN issued blue berets and DPM camouflage. They have a new UNIT insignia patch of a winged globe, which is worn the upper sleeves and beret. There is also a Czech engineer team wearing Czech camouflage with the same UN issued blue beret as the convoy. The Brigadier returns, wearing at different times service dress, barrack dress, and DPM while wearing a cap rather than beret.

After the series was cancelled and recommissioned, UNIT first had a minor appearance in the episode "Aliens of London" (2005). In this episode, UNIT were represented by four high-ranking US military officers, wearing Army Service Uniform with real UN peacekeeper patches on the sleeves, and Navy Service Uniform. Only the female officers wore headwear, the Army officer a garrison cap, the Navy officer a white female variation combination cap.

UNIT's first major appearance in the new series was in "The Christmas Invasion" in 2005. Here, a new insignia has been designed based on the Battlefield version. The troopers wear black uniforms consisting of police clothing/SAS Counter Revolutionary Warfare (CRW) Wing overalls and a red Royal Military Police beret, and equipment. Insignia is a small silver-metal UNIT parawings on a red beret and a large UNIT Parawing patch worn over the left breast pocket on the utility vest or fatigues. Commanding officers wear No. 2 service dress with UNIT insignia. Variations include Captain Magambo from "Turn Left" (2008) wearing a black version of service dress with a red beret, and Colonel Karim in The Sarah Jane Adventures story Death of the Doctor wearing black civilian clothes with UNIT insignia and rank epaulettes. This UNIT also includes a uniform for scientists: a lab-coat with the UNIT insignia on the chest.
 
UNIT returns in the series 7 episode "The Power of Three". Their uniforms in this series are an alteration of the uniforms seen since 2005. They no longer wear ID cards on the right breast pocket, and appear to lack the logos on the arms. They wear PASGT helmets with black covering and black goggles in place of berets. They also wear riot armour for their forearms and shins, and plain black brassards on the left arm. The scientific research department that now serves as the head of UNIT consists of plainclothes civilians.

The series 8 episode "Death in Heaven" introduces an officer uniform, consisting of black or navy-blue jacket and trousers, white shirt and black tie, with medal ribbons and rank epaulettes, inspired by (but not identical to) officers' No. 2 service dress, sans the gloves, peaked cap and Sam Browne shoulder belt.

Prominent members of UNIT
The Doctor, the main protagonist of Doctor Who, is a member of UNIT. In "Aliens of London", after reading up about the Doctor during his twelve-month absence, Mickey Smith tells Rose Tyler that the Ninth Doctor knows UNIT because "he's worked for them". In "The Sontaran Stratagem", Colonel Mace tells the Tenth Doctor, "Technically speaking, you're still on staff." In "The Day of the Doctor", the Eleventh Doctor tells Clara Oswald that he works for UNIT and that UNIT is his "job". In "Death in Heaven" (2014), Kate Stewart describes the Twelfth Doctor as "technically" still "on the payroll", as he never resigned.

Prominent members of the British contingent of UNIT include Dr. Elizabeth Shaw, Brigadier Alistair Gordon Lethbridge-Stewart, Sergeant Benton, Captain Yates, UNIT operative Jo Grant and later, Surgeon-Lieutenant Harry Sullivan, RN. After leaving the Doctor, Martha Jones joins UNIT. Civilians who have worked with UNIT include the journalist Sarah Jane Smith. In The Claws of Axos (1971), an American agent named Bill Filer was sent from Washington to assist in the hunt for the Master. Kate Stewart, the Brigadier's daughter, becomes Head of Scientific Research and Chief Scientific Officer, and appears in multiple episodes beginning with "The Power of Three" in 2012.

Republican Security Forces

The 1970 serial Inferno sees the Third Doctor visit a parallel universe. In this reality, Great Britain is a fascist republic, where the Royal Family was executed for treason in 1943, as depicted in the novel I, Alastair; the novel also shows that this universe's version of the Doctor was an associate of Oswald Mosley, and eventually became leader of the country following the downfall of the old order, with his picture being visible in the Brigade Leader's office in Inferno. The parallel version of the British contingent of UNIT is an SS-like state paramilitary organisation known as the Republican Security Forces (RSF), manning their version of the drilling project as a "scientific labour camp".

They are armed with a mixture of Soviet and German weapons, such as the SKS rifle and the Walther P38 pistol. Their rank system uses titles based loosely on that of the British Union of Fascists: Sergeant Benton is Platoon Under Leader Benton, Brigadier Lethbridge Stewart is Brigade Leader Lethbridge Stewart, and Elizabeth Shaw, a soldier rather than a scientist in their dimension, has the rank of Section Leader (which appears to be an officer rank). Their uniforms consist of contemporary US Army olive green military fatigues for Other Ranks, tan uniforms with black rank slides on the shoulders (based on the brown shirts) for officers, and black garrison caps with white piping and an RSF cap-badge as head-dress for both. The organisation has full authority to interrogate, court-martial, and formally execute prisoners as they see fit under the "Defence of the Republic Act, 1943".

By the end of the story, most of the members of the RSF are killed when a volcanic cataclysm engulfed Great Britain and left much of their world devastated.

Other appearances
UNIT has also been featured in many Doctor Who spin-offs. Different spin-offs have made varying attempts to be consistent with other stories.

Stage play
In 1984, a stage comedy titled Recall UNIT: The Great T-Bag Mystery was produced, written by Richard Franklin (Captain Yates) who reprised his character in the play. The cast also included John Levene as Benton, and the play was performed between 20 August and 24 August as part of the Edinburgh Fringe Festival. Due to other commitments, Nicholas Courtney was unable to appear as the Brigadier, but pre-recorded a telephone message from Lethbridge-Stewart which was written into the plot.

Novels
The novelisation of Remembrance of the Daleks (1990) by Ben Aaronovitch mentions that the troops that Gilmore commands were from the "Intrusion Counter-Measures Group". UNIT Exposed, the 1991 Doctor Who Magazine Winter Special, suggests that the ICMG is a forerunner of UNIT.

Both Virgin Publishing's Missing Adventures and BBC Books' Past Doctor Adventures have set stories in the UNIT era and have revealed new information about UNIT's past, present and future. The novel Business Unusual sees the Sixth Doctor assist UNIT in an investigation involving the now-retired Brigadier being held prisoner by the agents of the Nestene Consciousness, while Deep Blue sees the Fifth Doctor interact with the Third Doctor's UNIT colleagues at a time when his past self was away. Bullet Times pits the Seventh Doctor and Sarah Jane Smith against a branch of UNIT known as the 'Cortez Project', who consider any alien activity on Earth to be dangerous even if said aliens have no hostile intent, forcing the Doctor to discreetly work with a Chinese triad to help a crashed alien ship repair itself and depart.

No Future (1994) by Paul Cornell featured an intelligence section of UNIT in an alternate 1970s called Broadsword. Broadsword agents wore plain clothes and were "hand-picked to offer us lateral and non-military solutions, backed up by SAS training and sheer common sense".

The 1996 New Adventures novel Just War by Lance Parkin mentions "LONGBOW", a world security organisation set up by the League of Nations that encountered the occasional extraterrestrial incident but was disbanded after it and the League failed to prevent World War II.

The standalone 1996 Virgin novel Who Killed Kennedy by David Bishop, which provides a fictional history of UNIT from an investigative journalist's perspective, reveals Lethbridge-Stewart's role in proposing the formation of UNIT after the Yeti incident.

By the 26th century, UNIT has transformed into a secret society called the Unitatus, pledged to defend the Earth against alien threats, first seen in Parkin's Cold Fusion (1996).

The Dying Days (1997), also by Parkin, names the French division of UNIT as NUIT (Nations Unies Intelligence Taskforce).

The Unitatus lasts at least until the 30th century, according to So Vile a Sin (1997) by Ben Aaronovitch and Kate Orman.

The Devil Goblins from Neptune (1997) by Keith Topping and Martin Day introduced a division within the Central Intelligence Agency headed by a man known only as Control, which has featured as a rival to UNIT in subsequent novels The King of Terror and Escape Velocity, King seeing the Fifth Doctor working with the Brigadier on an investigation in 1999 that forces them to work with the CIA and Control, and Escape depicting Control trying to deal with a new alien presence on Earth before UNIT discover it, only for the threat to be thwarted by the amnesic Eighth Doctor. Alien Bodies (1997) by Lawrence Miles introduced a more ruthless UN division called UNISYC (United Nations Intelligence Security Yard Corps), which by the 2040s has replaced UNIT.

The Face of the Enemy (1998) by David A. McIntee has the British branch of UNIT facing a menace without the Third Doctor to help them, as he and Jo Grant are elsewhere (and elsewhen) experiencing the television serial The Curse of Peladon.

The Southeast Asian contingent of UNIT is identified in McIntee's Bullet Time (2001) as UNIT-SEA.

The 2003 Eighth Doctor Adventure Emotional Chemistry by Simon A. Forward names the Russian division of UNIT ОГРОН (OGRON) (Оперативная Группа Разведки Объединённых Наций, or, Operativnaya Gruppa Razvedki Obyedinyonnih Natsiy, which roughly translates as "United Nations Reconnaissance Operations Group").

Comic strips
The Doctor Who Magazine comic strip also frequently features UNIT, and in the 1980s introduced a new UNIT officer, Muriel Frost.

One story, Final Genesis (DWM #203–206), is set in a parallel universe in which humanity has made peace with the Silurians, and UNIT has become the United Races Intelligence Command.

The Eighth Doctor comic strip The Flood (DWM #346–353) establishes that the British Secret Intelligence Service (MI6) views UNIT with some degree of contempt in the early 21st century, and deliberately does not inform them when it detects a Cyberman incursion due to this and other unspecified problems with the United Kingdom's relationship with the United Nations.

The Tenth Doctor comic strip The Age of Ice (DWM #408–411) is set in UNIT's Australian base beneath Sydney Harbour. The Eleventh Doctor strip The Golden Ones (DWM #425–428) introduces UNIT Japan.

UNIT has also appeared in cameo roles in unrelated comics. In at least one issue of Uncanny X-Men, where a character identified as Brigadier Lethbridge-Stewart was seen briefly from behind, addressing a Sergeant-Major Benton; 2000 AD's Caballistics, Inc. strip has Lethbridge-Stewart (referred to solely by rank) appearing in several adventures as a military liaison and referring to The Web of Fear; and Hip Flask has a 22nd-century UNIT tied into the origins of the Elephantmen. Marvel Comics also has two major characters called Dr Alistaire Stuart (who has claimed to know "a chap from Gallifrey") and Brigadier Alysande Stuart, Scientific Advisor and commander, respectively, of Britain's Weird Happenings Organisation (W.H.O.) taskforce. W.H.O. has since been disbanded and Alysande killed, but Alistaire Stuart is still a recurring character in Marvel's United Kingdom.

The Titan Comics Ninth Doctor series includes a storyline where the Ninth Doctor, Rose Tyler and Captain Jack Harkness work with UNIT in the mid-1970s when rival anti-alien organization 'Avalon Defence' try to undermine UNIT's reputation so that they can take over in exchange for financial benefits. The storyline concludes with UNIT nurse Tara Misha joining the TARDIS crew after she sacrifices her own reputation to expose Avalon's deceptions.

Audio plays
An alternate universe version of UNIT and the Brigadier appear in the Doctor Who Unbound audio play Sympathy for the Devil (2003), produced by Big Finish Productions. In this story, UNIT is commanded by the abrasive Colonel Brimmicombe-Wood. The story concerns a UNIT that never had the Third Doctor working for it, with many different outcomes; Terror of the Autons resulted in "the Plastic Purges", Mike Yates died on a time-travel mission to destroy the Silurians, and so on.

In December 2004, Big Finish released UNIT: Time Heals, the first audio drama in a UNIT spin-off series, which features a retired General Sir Alistair Lethbridge-Stewart as an advisor to a new generation of officers. A preview episode (given away free with Doctor Who Magazine #351, and later available as a free download on the Big Finish website), UNIT: The Coup, has Lethbridge-Stewart finally breaking decades of secrecy by informing a press conference of UNIT's true purpose as humanity's first line of defence against the unknown (although, as it turns out, the general public believe this to be a hoax). The series also introduced another rival division, this time within the British government, the Internal Counter-Intelligence Service, or ICIS.

The protagonists for most of this series are Colonel Emily Chaudhry, Lieutenant Will Hoffman and Colonel Robert Dalton. Hoffman and Dalton are killed in the third instalment, UNIT: The Longest Night (2005). The fourth play, UNIT: The Wasting (2005), features this universe's version of Brimmicombe-Wood, and is revealed to have been the commander of ICIS all along, and working to destroy UNIT from within. The short story "The Terror of the Darkness" in the collection Short Trips: A Day in the Life (2005) reveals that Chaudhry and Hoffman had previously travelled with the Sixth Doctor. Their adventures then continue in "Incongruous Details" in Short Trips: The Centenarian (2006) before ending in Short Trips: Defining Patterns (2008).

Following the death of Lethbridge-Stewart's actor Nicholas Courtney in 2011, in 2015, Big Finish announced a new series of UNIT audio dramas to be released in six-month intervals beginning with UNIT: Extinction in November. The series features Lethbridge-Stewart's daughter Kate Stewart in her role as Head of Scientific Research, as established in "The Power of Three" (2012), and is the first time that Big Finish have been licensed elements from the 2005 revival series from BBC Worldwide.

Direct-to-video productions
In 1987, John Levene reprised his role as Benton for a made-for-video film entitled Wartime. Produced by Reeltime Pictures, this was the first independently made Doctor Who spin-off film and was followed by many others over the next 20 years. In 1997, the film was revised with voice-over dialogue provided by Nicholas Courtney in character as Lethbridge-Stewart. The Brigadier himself got a made-for-video film, Downtime, which also sees appearances from UNIT and a corrupt UNIT officer named Captain Cavendish.

BBV have made a trilogy of UNIT videos involving the Autons, although they feature none of the original members, with the main character being Lockwood (a codename for the otherwise nameless UNIT Operative 8954B)—an investigator with psychic powers. The trilogy introduced one of UNIT's facilities (the Warehouse) for containing the remains of alien technology; the Containment Team responsible for these facilities and preventing alien outbreaks at them; and the Internal Security Division.

Other media
In an issue of the Uncanny X-Men, U.N.I.T forces led by Sergeant Benton can be seen loading an unconscious Juggernaut into a lorry while Benton receives a message.

In the internet Flash animation Scream of the Shalka, Major Kennet hands the Doctor a folder with a UNIT crest on it.

For the new television series, BBC created a faux website for UNIT, complete with "easter eggs" that can be accessed by the reader with the passwords "bison" and "buffalo" (the latter mentioned on screen in "World War Three"). The 'public' part of the website advertises UNIT Conferences and publications relating to "extra-territorial threats", as well as press releases on the establishment of a central New York Liaison office; the press releases and publications also make reference to off-screen adventures, such as the Skaniska Incident and Jersey Tollgate Situation, with the most recent covering the events of "The Christmas Invasion" (2005) ("Alien Life Confirmed"). The Secure Login link, using the password "badwolf" (originally "bison") uncovers a 'private' section which provides UNIT point-of-view reports about various events in the 2005 series, as well as mention of missions such as The Fourth Reich and Guatemala "Big Locust" Problem. Due to the objections by the United Nations as noted above, the letters "UN" are no longer expanded to "United Nations" on the website.

UNIT dating
The original 1963–1989 series presents conflicting evidence about when the stories featuring UNIT are meant to take place, and there has been much confusion and continuing fan debate on this subject. Initially the production team intended for the UNIT stories to take place in the 1980s. In the 1975 story Pyramids of Mars, Sarah Jane Smith explicitly states that she is "from 1980". However, the 1983 story Mawdryn Undead explicitly states that the Brigadier retired from UNIT in 1976 and that Warrant Officer Benton left the army in 1979.

A reference to this confusion appeared in the 2008 episode "The Sontaran Stratagem", where the Doctor was unsure if his time on the UNIT staff took place during the 1970s or the 1980s. Similarly, The Sarah Jane Adventures story The Lost Boy displays a UNIT file on Sarah Jane Smith which says, "The service quickly expanded, making our presence felt in a golden period that spanned the sixties, the seventies, and, some would say, the eighties." Yet another reference occurred in "The Day of the Doctor", where Kate Stewart refers to "one of my father's incident files. Codename: Cromer. Seventies or eighties depending on the dating protocol". The Cromer wording is a reference to the 1972–73-story The Three Doctors which, as well as being the first time that Doctors from different eras come together to fight a common foe was the occasion where Brigadier Lethbridge-Stewart, on first being transported to an alien world, likened it to the Norfolk coastal town of Cromer. Kate Stewart again refers to the confusion when she describes events from Terror of the Zygons as occurring in the "'70s (or) '80s" ("The Zygon Invasion").

A possible justification for at least some of these dating anomalies can be found in the audio adventure The Legacy of Time: The Split Infinitive, when a temporal anomaly results in the 1960s and 1970s becoming briefly linked when a flawed time travel experiment essentially splits an individual between these eras. When the crisis concludes after the Seventh Doctor brings the two aspects together, he notes that the resulting temporal explosion will cause a range of minor anomalies to anyone in this era who has dealt with time travel, reflecting that this explains how someone who was working in the eighties could have retired in the seventies.

The episode "Survivors of the Flux" makes reference to the conflicting dates during a scene in which Kate Stewart accuses The Grand Serpent of deliberately tampering with evidence, photographs and dates in order to cover up his infiltration of UNIT.

Critical reception
The concept of UNIT has been generally well received by Doctor Who fans. In Andrew Cartmel's Through Time: An Unauthorised and Unofficial History of Doctor Who, the sharp contrast between the Doctor's eccentric personality and the seriousness and normality of UNIT is described by Cartmel as an "inspired stroke".

The organisation is often seen within the context of other international organisations which featured in science fiction of the post-war era. Among others, these included SMERSH and SPECTRE from the James Bond novels, S.H.I.E.L.D. from Marvel Comics, and U.N.C.L.E. from The Man from U.N.C.L.E.—like UNIT, intended as a fictional United Nations intelligence agency. There was even a one-season wonder telecast by NBC, in 1979, in which Robert Conrad played A Man Called Sloane who worked for a top-secret agency openly called UNIT.

See also

List of UNIT personnel

References

External links
  (BBC-sponsored) [Password= "badwolf", Password= "buffalo"]

 

 
Fictional intelligence agencies
Fictional military organizations
Fiction set in the 1980s